Where Is Where is the second album by Cetu Javu, released in 1992.

Track listing
All songs written by Cetu Javu.

CD: MXCD-325
 "Dáme Tu Mano" – 3:53
 "Where" – 5:01
 "Un Día Normal" – 5:04
 "News" – 4:20
 "Tiempo" – 4:22
 "Caribbean Dream" – 4:16
 "Sometimes" – 4:30
 "Una Mujer" – 4:42
 "Another Step" – 4:53
 "Segregation" – 3:46
 "Time" - 4:23
 "Por Que?" - 4:07

LP: MXLP-325

Side one
 "Dáme Tu Mano" – 3:53
 "Where" – 5:01
 "Un Día Normal" – 5:04
 "News" – 4:20
 "Tiempo" – 4:22
 "Caribbean Dream" - 4:16

Side two
 "Sometimes" – 4:30
 "Una Mujer" – 4:42
 "Another Step" – 4:53
 "Segregation" – 3:46
 "Time" – 4:23
 "Por Que?" - 4:07

CS: CAS-325

Side one
 "Dáme Tu Mano" – 3:53
 "Where" – 5:01
 "Un Día Normal" – 5:04
 "News" – 4:20
 "Tiempo" – 4:22

Side two
 "Caribbean Dream" – 4:16
 "Sometimes" – 4:30
 "Una Mujer" – 4:42
 "Another Step" – 4:53
 "Segregation" - 3:46

Personnel

Musicians
 Javier Revilla-Diez: lead vocals and backing vocals
 Chris Demere: synthesizers and drum machine
 Torsten Engelke: synthesizers
 Thorsten Kraass: synthesizers

Production
 Recorded and mixed at Hansa Tonstudio, Berlin, Tritonus Studio, Berlin
 Produced by Cetu Javu
 Engineered by Marc Karpinski
 Executive production: Modermusic
 Management: Modermusic

External links
 Where is where at Discogs

References

1992 albums
Cetu Javu albums